Saurya Airlines Pvt. Ltd is an airline based in Kathmandu, Nepal. As of August 2017, the airline serves five destinations across three provinces of Nepal from its hub at Tribhuvan International Airport. Saurya Airlines operates a fleet of CRJ 200 aircraft. Saurya Airlines was the first airline to introduce Canadair Regional Jet in Nepal, also becoming the second airline in Nepal after Cosmic Air to operate a jet engine aircraft on the domestic routes.

History
Saurya Airlines brought its first aircraft, a CRJ 200 on 18 August 2014 and commenced its first operation on 17 November 2014 by conducting a mountain flight and a round trip to Biratnagar Airport from Kathmandu Airport after it was forced to keep its new plane grounded for nearly three months due to lengthy paperwork. The company later added a daily service to Bhadrapur making it its second southeastern destination. On 22 June 2015, Saurya Airlines launched flights to Nepalgunj.  

At the beginning of 2016, Saurya Airlines was constrained to operate  charter flights as per the regulations of Civil Aviation Authority of Nepal after the company failed to meet the minimum required number of aircraft needed to operate as a scheduled passenger carrier. However, the company managed to provide the service to the passengers by operating scheduled charter flights. In 2016, Saurya Airlines served 90,205 passengers with the growth rate of 3.76 percent from the previous year.

In March 2017, Saurya Airlines added second CRJ 200 aircraft to its fleet, and regained the certificate to operate scheduled flights again. This "9N-AME" aircraft was painted with a "Tata Tiago livery" as per the agreement with Sipradi Trading, making the airline-first Nepalese fixed-wing aircraft company to wear the international trademark on aircraft livery.

In 2018, the airline was grounded by Tribhuvan International Airport, as it owed Nepali rupees 30 million in service charges to the airport. In March 2019, the airline cleared its dues and restarted its flight operations.

Also in 2018, the airline was sold to a group of Non Resident Nepalis for 320 million Nepali rupees. However, in 2019, the ownership changed again, when the Indian Kuber Group acquired the airline for 630 million Nepali rupees. Following this, in July 2021, first news reports surfaced claiming that the airline would rebrand itself as Kuber Airlines.

Destinations
Saurya Airlines serves to these destinations as of January 2023:

Fleet

The Saurya Airlines fleet consists of the following aircraft (as of October 2020):

References

External links

Airlines of Nepal
Airlines established in 2014
2014 establishments in Nepal